Blitum californicum (syn. Chenopodium californicum) is a species of flowering plant in the amaranth family known by the common names California goosefoot and (ambiguously) "Indian lettuce".

It is native to California and Baja California where it can be found below  in open areas in a number of habitat types, such as grassland, chaparral, desert, and montane.

Description
This is a perennial herb producing a number of decumbent to erect stems which approach a meter in maximum height when growing upright. It grows from a thick, fleshy caudex. When there are many stems the plant may form a clump or mat. The leaves grow on long petioles and are triangular or arrowhead-shaped and up to about 10 centimeters long. The edges are deeply and sharply toothed.

The inflorescences are spherical clusters dotted along an inflorescence-like spike. Each dense cluster contains several rounded flowers, with each flower a series of flat lobes covering the developing fruit. The fruit is a reddish utricle layered around the surface of the seed.

Uses
California goosefoot was used for a variety of purposes by Native Americans including use as a medicine and a source of soap, in addition to the use of the seeds for flour and the leaves and shoots as a cooked vegetable.

References

External links

 
 
 

californicum
Flora of California
Flora of Baja California
Flora of the California desert regions
Flora of the Sierra Nevada (United States)
Natural history of the California chaparral and woodlands
Natural history of the Central Valley (California)
Edible nuts and seeds
Leaf vegetables
Plants used in Native American cuisine
Pre-Columbian California cuisine
Taxa named by Sereno Watson
Plants described in 1874
Flora without expected TNC conservation status